Vilém Burian (born August 16, 1988) is a Czech professional ice hockey player. He played with HC České Budějovice in the Czech Extraliga during the 2010–11 Czech Extraliga season.

References

External links

1988 births
Living people
Motor České Budějovice players
Czech ice hockey forwards
Sportspeople from Zlín
SK Horácká Slavia Třebíč players
LHK Jestřábi Prostějov players
HC Olomouc players
HC Kometa Brno players